The Kerry Intermediate Football Championship is an annual Gaelic football competition contested by mid-tier Kerry GAA clubs.

Rathmore are the title holders (2022)..

Teams

2023 Teams

Honours
The winners can be promoted to play in the Kerry Senior Football Championship in the year after they win this competition.

The winners of the Kerry Intermediate Football Championship progress to the Munster Intermediate Club Football Championship, representing Kerry, later that year, or, as was the case in 2021, the following year. They often do well there and recent winners include Templenoe in 2019 and Na Gaeil winning in 2022 after winning the Kerry Intermediate Football Championship in 2021. Kilcummin made it 12 wins for Kerry out of 13 in 2018. The winners can then go on and win the All-Ireland Intermediate Club Football Championship title like Milltown/Castlemaine did in 2012.

Teams beaten in the first round take part in the Intermediate Football Shield. The winners collect the Fenian Cup.

History

The competition was revived in 1959, and District Boards had the right to enter teams. 

Kerry senior players play in the Kerry Intermediate Football Championship. 2014 All-Ireland winner Peter Crowley had a season-ending cruciate injury from playing for Laune Rangers in it in 2019 and missed the 2019 All-Ireland Senior Football Championship as a result. 2021 winners Na Gaeil boasted ex-Australian Football League professional Stefan Okunbor, Diarmuid O'Connor and brothers Jack and Andrew Barry in their ranks.

Roll of honour

Wins listed by club
 Kenmare Shamrocks (6): 1940, 1968, 1970, 1972, 1990, 2016

 Annascaul (4): 1982, 1987, 1992, 2007

 Dingle (4): 1988, 1989, 1996, 2004

 Milltown/Castlemaine (4): 1991, 1994, 2003, 2011

 Ballylongford (3): 1971, 1976, 1977

 Castleisland Desmonds (3): 1976, 1979, 1981

 An Ghaeltacht (3): 1933, 1998, 2017

 Spa (3): 1974, 2009, 2020

 Valentia Young Islanders (2): 1986, 1995

 Ardfert (2): 2006, 2014

 St Mary's (2): 2001, 2015

 Kilcummin (2): 1997, 2018

 Rathmore (2): 1999, 2022

 Castlegregory (2): 1942. 1975

 Keel (1): 1969

 Dr Crokes (1): 1985

 Waterville (1): 1993

 Listowel Emmets (1): 2002

 Legion (1): 2005

 St Michael's/Foilmore (1): 2008

 Gneeveguilla (1): 2010

 Finuge (1): 2012

 Templenoe (1): 2019

 Army Ballymullen Barracks (1): 1943

References

 
2
Intermediate Gaelic football county championships